In the brain, the cavum veli interpositi (CVI) is a condition in which the cistern of the velum interpositum becomes dilated. The phenomenon usually occurs in newborns.

Axial MR/CT show a triangular-shaped cerebrospinal fluid (CSF) space between the lateral ventricles. On sagittal images, CVI can appear as a slit-like, linear-to-round/ovoid CSF collection below the fornices, and above the 3rd ventricle.

There are usually no associated abnormalities, although larger lesions may cause an obstructive hydrocephalus. No treatment is usually necessary.

See also
 Cavum Vergae
 Cavum septi pellucidi

References

Brain
Ventricular system